Edward Mowbray Nicholas Howard, 8th Earl of Effingham (born 11 May 1971) is a hereditary peer in the peerage of the United Kingdom and an elected Conservative member of the House of Lords.

He is also the 18th Baron Howard of Effingham, being a direct descendant of the Elizabethan statesman William Howard, 1st Baron Howard of Effingham. 

The only son of David Howard, 7th Earl of Effingham, he was styled as Lord Howard of Effingham from 1996 until inheriting his father’s peerages in February 2022. In October of the same year he was one of the two successful candidates in a Conservative hereditary peers' by-election to replace Lord Astor of Hever and the Earl of Home.

On 5 April 2002, at Lima, Peru, Howard married Tatiana Tafur, and they have two children.

In his candidate statement in support of his election to the Lords, Effingham said in 2022 that he had a degree in Classics from the University of Bristol and had worked in finance at Barclays, advising British companies on foreign exchange and treasury. He described himself as "a proponent of sport for all" and was living and working in London.

References

1971 births
Living people
Conservative Party (UK) hereditary peers
Barons Howard of Effingham
Earls in the Peerage of the United Kingdom
Edward
Alumni of the University of Bristol
Barclays people
Politicians from London
Hereditary peers elected under the House of Lords Act 1999